La conquista dei diamanti is a 1915 Italian film directed by Augusto Genina, the sequel to his earlier film, La fuga dei diamanti of 1914.

References

Bibliography
 Aldo Bernardini, 2015: Le imprese di produzione del cinema muto italiano, Bologna: Persiani 
 Sergio G. Germani, Vittorio Martinelli, 1989: Il cinema di Augusto Genina. Pordenone: Biblioteca dell'Immagine 
 Vittorio Martinelli, 1993: Il cinema muto italiano, I film degli anni d'oro. 1915, Torino ERI, Roma, C.S.C.

External links 
 

1915 films
Italian silent feature films
Films directed by Augusto Genina
Italian black-and-white films